Canadian singer and songwriter Carly Rae Jepsen has released six studio albums, two remix albums, four EPs, 28 singles, 10 promotional singles, and 24 music videos. In 2007, Jepsen finished third in the fifth season of the talent series Canadian Idol. She subsequently signed a recording contract with Fontana and MapleMusic.

Tug of War, her debut album, was released in September 2008. The album spawned two Canadian Hot 100 top 40 singles, "Tug of War" and "Bucket", both of which were accredited gold certifications by Music Canada (MC). Her second album, Kiss, was released in September 2012. "Call Me Maybe", also the lead single from her 2012 EP Curiosity, attained international success, reaching number one in Canada, Australia, the United Kingdom and the United States, among others. Curiosity went on peak at number six on the Canadian Albums Chart. Its title track was released as its second single, peaking at number 18 in Canada. The same year, she and Owl City released single "Good Time". It topped the charts in Canada and New Zealand and reached the top ten in several other countries, including Australia, Ireland, United Kingdom and the United States.

Jepsen's third album, Emotion, was released in 2015 and is influenced by songs from the 1980s. Its lead single "I Really Like You", peaked at number 14 in Canada and attained top five positions in Japan and the UK. The album produced two further singles: "Run Away with Me" and "Your Type". In August 2016, Jepsen released Emotion: Side B, an EP containing eight cut tracks from Emotion. The EP received critical acclaim from Rolling Stone and Pitchfork. In May 2017, Jepsen released the single "Cut to the Feeling" which appeared on a Japanese deluxe version of the Side B EP.

Her fourth album, Dedicated, was released in 2019 and included the singles "Party for One", "Now That I Found You", "No Drug Like Me", "Julien" and "Too Much". A companion album Dedicated Side B was released the following year, containing twelve additional unreleased tracks from Dedicated. Jepsen's sixth studio album The Loneliest Time was written and later released in 2022. It includes the singles "Western Wind", "Beach House", "Talking to Yourself" and the title track featuring fellow Canadian musician Rufus Wainwright.

Albums

Studio albums

Remix albums

Extended plays

Singles

As lead artist

As featured artist

Promotional singles

Other charted songs

Guest appearances

Songwriting credits

Music videos

Footnotes

References

Discographies of Canadian artists
Pop music discographies
Discography